The 2002–03 FIBA Europe Champions Cup was the first edition of Europe's 4th-tier level transnational competition for men's professional basketball clubs, the FIBA Europe Champions Cup, following the merger of the FIBA Korać Cup and FIBA Saporta Cup competitions into the new ULEB Cup competition. In this first edition of the competition, it was actually the 2nd or 3rd-tier level on the European club basketball pyramid, featuring 15 domestic champions. The season consisted of 64 teams. The Greek club Aris Thessaloniki won the title, after beating the Polish club Prokom Trefl Sopot in the Final, which was held at Alexandreio Melathron, in Thessaloniki, Greece.

The competition, which was initially advertised as FIBA's attempt to revive the FIBA European Champions Cup (now known as the EuroLeague). The competition attracted 15 national domestic league champions, and teams from 30 European national leagues, which represented it as a truly pan-European event. However, the competition was only able to attract second division clubs from Italy and Spain, and the newly promoted champion of the Israeli second division. The league was unable to make a good commercial impact, and was then dropped to being the European 4th-tier level in the following 2003–04 season, as FIBA launched the FIBA Europe League to replace it.

Teams

Competition system
 64 teams from countries affiliated to FIBA Europe enter a Regional Qualifying Round (RQR), distributed in three major conferences (North, South and West) according to their geographical location. Within each conference, the teams are further divided into groups and play a Round-robin. The final standing is based on individual wins and defeats. In case of a tie between two or more teams after this group stage, the following criteria are used to decide the final classification: 1) number of wins in one-to-one games between the teams; 2) basket average between the teams; 3) general basket average within the group.
 The RQR group winners and runners-up, together with the best third-placed teams, advance to Pan-European Phase (PEP). Before the PEP phase, the group champions of the RQR Northern and Southern conferences participate in a final round to contest for the symbolic title of Conference Champion- in the case of the Northern conference, the final four doubles as NEBL championship (North European Basketball League).
 The 24 teams qualified for the PEP are divided into six groups of four teams each playing a Round-robin. The group winners, together with the two best runners-up, qualify for a quarterfinal play-off (x-pairings, home and away games).
 The four winners of the quarterfinal play-off qualify for the final stage (Final Four), played at a predetermined venue. The winner gets a wild card to participate in 2003–04 FIBA Europe League.

Conference North
The season ran from October 1, 2002 to November 5, 2002.

Before the PEP phase, the group champions of the RQR Northern conference participate in a final round to contest for the symbolic title of Conference Champion

Semifinals
January 14, Vilnius Palace of Sports, Vilnius

|}

3rd place game
January 15, Vilnius Palace of Sports, Vilnius

|}

Final
January 15, Vilnius Palace of Sports, Vilnius

|}

Conference South
The season ran from October 1, 2002 to November 5, 2002.

Before the PEP phase, the group champions of the RQR Southern conference participate in a final round to contest for the symbolic title of Conference Champion

Semifinals
January 16, Universiada Hall, Sofia

|}

3rd place game
January 17, Universiada Hall, Sofia

|}

Final
January 17, Universiada Hall, Sofia

|}

Conference West
The season ran from October 1, 2002 to November 5, 2002.

Group C

Pan-European phase
The phase ran from February 2, 2003 to March 25, 2003.

Quarterfinals
The quarterfinals were two-legged ties determined on aggregate score. The first legs was played on April 8. All return legs were played on April 15.

|}

Final Four

Semifinals
 May 2, 2003 at Alexandreio Melathron in Thessaloniki, Greece.

|}

3rd place game
 May 4, 2003 at Alexandreio Melathron in Thessaloniki, Greece.

|}

Final
 May 4, 2003 at Alexandreio Melathron in Thessaloniki, Greece.

|}

Final standings

See also
 2002–03 Euroleague
 2002–03 ULEB Cup
 2002–03 FIBA Europe Regional Challenge Cup

References

FIBA EuroCup Challenge
FIBA